Blastochloris viridis is a bacterium from the genus of Blastochloris which was isolated from water of the Dreisam river in Freiburg im Breichsgau, Germany

References

Further reading

External links
Type strain of Blastochloris viridis at BacDive -  the Bacterial Diversity Metadatabase

Hyphomicrobiales
Bacteria described in 1997